Anthro New England (ANE) is a furry convention that is held in the Greater Boston area of the U.S. state of Massachusetts. It was first held in 2015 in Cambridge, Massachusetts, but moved to the Boston Park Plaza in 2018 and has been held in Boston annually since then. For 2023, Anthro New England is now being held at the Westin Boston Seaport Hotel. The 2021 event was held online due to the COVID-19 pandemic. It is among the largest furry conventions held in the United States.

History 
Anthro New England (ANE) was organized in 2014 in order to host a furry convention in Greater Boston. Their first event was held from February 27 to March 1, 2015, at the Hotel Regency Cambridge in Cambridge, Massachusetts. During the first con, 165 people took part in the fursuit parade. Another furry convention, the Maltese FurCon, had been held at the Hilton Hotel at Logan International Airport in 2014, but despite plans to host another event in 2015, the event was ultimately canceled. By 2018, ANE had become one of the largest annual furry conventions, with the 2019 event attracting over 2,000 attendees.

Anthro New England by year

Notes

References

Further reading

External links 
 
 

Annual events in Boston
Conventions in Boston
Festivals established in 2015
Festivals in Boston
Furry conventions